W Line may refer to:
W (New York City Subway service)
W Line (Norfolk Southern), a freight rail line
W Line (RTD), a light rail line in Denver and Jefferson County, Colorado
W (Los Angeles Railway), a former streetcar line in Los Angeles, California